Vincenzo Ferrera (born April 21, 1973, in Palermo) is an Italian actor.

Biography 
Vincenzo Ferrera was born in Palermo on April 21, 1973. He has shown an interest in acting since he was a teenager. Ferrera started taking part in theater organizations immediately after high school. He entered the world of entertainment with the Teatro Biondo school and with the Gruppo della Rocca. In 2008, he participated in the Rai 3 soap opera Agrodolce, in the role of Stefano Martorana.

Ferrera also appeared in the film Borsellino's angels in 2003, directed by Rocco Casareo, in the role of Vincenzo Li Muli, the miniseries An almost perfect dad, directed by Maurizio Dell'Orso, broadcast by Rai 1, in which she is co-protagonist together with Michele Placido, Il capo dei capi, in the role of Commissioner Beppe Montana, broadcast in 2007 on Canale 5, The thirteenth apostle, The young Montalbano, Un posto al sole, in the role of Eduardo Nappi and Utopia in the role of Mino Pecorelli. In Mare fuori is the educator Beppe Romano while in Survivors he is Gaetano Russo.

Filmography

Cinema 
 Monella, directed by Tinto Brass (1998)
 Rose e pistole, directed by Carla Apuzzo (1998)
 I fetentoni, directed by Alessandro Di Robilant (1999)
 Quartetto, directed by Salvatore Piscicelli (2001)
 La rivincita, directed by Armenia Balducci (2002)
 La repubblica di San Gennaro, directed by Massimo Costa (2003) 
 Alla fine della notte, directed by Salvatore Piscicelli (2003)
 ...e dopo cadde la neve, directed by Donatella Baglivo (2005)
 Amore e libertà - Masaniello, directed by Angelo Antonucci (2006)
 L'amore buio, directed by Antonio Capuano (2010) 
 Breve storia di lunghi tradimenti, directed by Davide Marengo (2012)
 Ma che bella sorpresa, directed by Alessandro Genovesi (2015)
 Adesso tocca a me, directed by Francesco Miccichè (2017)
 La mia banda suona il pop, directed by Fausto Brizzi (2020)
La notte più lunga dell'anno, directed by Simone Aleandri (2022)

Television 
 Positano, directed by Vittorio Sindoni - miniseries (1996)
 Non lasciamoci più, directed by Vittorio Sindoni - miniseries (2000)
 Inviati speciali, directed by Francesco Laudadio - TV film (2001)
 Sospetti 2, directed by Gianni Lepre - miniseries (2003)
 La squadra (2004)
 Joe Petrosino, directed by Alfredo Peyretti - TV film (2006)
 Donna detective, directed by Cinzia TH Torrini - miniseries (2007-2010)
 Il generale Dalla Chiesa, directed by Giorgio Capitani - TV film (2007)
 Scusate il disturbo, directed by Luca Manfredi - miniseries (2009)
 Io e mio figlio - Nuove storie per il commissario Vivaldi, directed by Luciano Odorisio - miniseries, 1 episode (2010)
 All Stars, directed by Massimo Martelli (2010)
 Tutti i padri di Maria, directed by Luca Manfredi - miniseries (2010)
 L'oro di Scampia, directed by Marco Pontecorvo - TV film (2014)
 Una pallottola nel cuore, directed by Luca Manfredi - episode 3 "Il passato che ritorna" (2014)
 Non uccidere, directed by Giuseppe Gagliardi - miniseries, 6º episodio (2015)
 L'allieva, episode 6 "Corno d'Africa" (2016)
 Paolo Borsellino - Adesso tocca a me, directed by Francesco Micciché - documentary (2017)
 Squadra mobile - Operazione Mafia Capitale, directed by Alexis Sweet, 14 episodes (2017)
 In punta di piedi, directed by Alessandro D'Alatri - TV film (2018)
 Mare fuori, directed by Carmine Elia, Milena Cocozza e Ivan Silvestrini (2020-in corso)

References

External links

1973 births
Living people
Actors from Palermo
Italian film actors
Italian television actors